

Alpine skiing

Men

Cross country skiing

Men

Women

References

Nations at the 2011 Asian Winter Games
Asian Winter Games
2011